Comilla Railway Station is a primary railway station of the Eastern railway located in the town of Comilla. Every day trains from Dhaka, Chittagong, Sylhet, Mymensingh, Brahmanbaria, Chandpur and other districts run through this station. The railway station of Comilla established in 1895. In the same year, a railway line was constructed from this place to Chittagong with a length of 149.89 km. All trains entering Chittagong stop at Comilla Railway Station.

Train service
Every day more than 13 trains run through Comilla railway station. Below is a list of trains running through Comilla Railway Station:
 Mahanagar Prabhati / Godhuli Express
 Upokul Express
 Paharika Express
 Mahanagar Express
 Udayan Express
 Turna Express
 Bijoy Express
 Dhaka/Chittagong Mail
 Karnaphuli Express
 Jalalabad Express
 Mymensingh Express
 Chattala Express

Gallery

References

Cumilla
Railway stations in Chittagong Division
Railway stations opened in 1895
1895 establishments in British India